The Rock Corral on the Barlow Road is a glacial erratic, on Oregon's Barlow Road, itself a new route on the Oregon Trail.

Its location

It is on the way to Marmot, where the Barlow Road then goes southwest cross the Devil's Backbone and back across the Sandy River.

It is in Clackamas County, and was at the end of the Oregon Trail's most difficult, most dangerous passage over the Cascade Mountains. The Barlow Tollgate was once there.

References

External links and references

 BLM site
 Site with a map
 National Registerof Historic Places site
 Google site

Glacial erratics of Oregon
National Register of Historic Places in Clackamas County, Oregon